John Albert Stokes (2 April 1920 – 20 March 2013) was a British animation director best known for his work on the 1968 Beatles film Yellow Submarine.

Life and career 
Jack Stokes began his training at Southend College of Art. After serving in the RAF during the Second World War, he was fortunate to be taken on as a trainee animator at the Gaumont British Animation studio which had recently opened at Moor Hall, Berkshire. Such opportunities were almost unknown in Britain in the post-war years.

By the early 1960s he had established his own studio, Stokes Cartoons, producing work for cinema and television. It was during this time that he began working with the Canadian film-maker George Dunning, and with his friend John Coates who ran another London animation studio, TVC. In 1965 TVC produced an animated series for US television entitled simply The Beatles which, although it was very successful in the United States was never shown on British television. Following on from this, Stokes was commissioned to create animations for the title sequences of the Beatles' 1967 film, Magical Mystery Tour. Then in 1968, along with Bob Balser, he created his most well-known animations, from the work of illustrator Heinz Edelmann, for the film Yellow Submarine, directed by Dunning.

Throughout the 1970s, 1980s and 1990s he worked on a number of films and television series, including episodes of Roobarb and adaptations of Beatrix Potter's The Tailor of Gloucester and Charles Kingsley's The Water Babies. In 1975–76, Richard Williams chose him and Gerald Potterton to represent the London contingent of Raggedy Ann & Andy: A Musical Adventure.

He retired in his 80s, and died on 20 March 2013, aged 92.

Filmography

References

External links 

Filmography on the British Film Institute website

1920 births
2013 deaths
British animated film directors
British animators
Royal Air Force personnel of World War II